NGC 332 is a compact and/or lenticular galaxy in the constellation Pisces. It was discovered on October 22, 1886 by Lewis Swift. It was described by Dreyer as "very faint, small, round, several stars near to south."

References

External links
 

0332
18861022
Pisces (constellation)
Discoveries by Lewis Swift
Lenticular galaxies
003511